The pied-crested tit-tyrant (Anairetes reguloides) is a species of bird in the family Tyrannidae. It is found in coastal Peru and far northern Chile.

Its natural habitats are subtropical or tropical moist shrubland and subtropical or tropical high-altitude shrubland.

Taxonomy
The pied-crested tit-tyrant's genus, Anairetes, is believed to be most closely related to the genera Mecocerculus and Serpophaga; however, there is no definitive evidence supporting this claim. Members of the genus Anairetes are known commonly as tit-tyrants because their active foraging behavior and crests are reminiscent of the true tits in the family Paridae.

References

pied-crested tit-tyrant
Birds of Peru
pied-crested tit-tyrant
Taxonomy articles created by Polbot
Taxa named by Frédéric de Lafresnaye
Taxa named by Alcide d'Orbigny